Manilaid is a  Estonian islet in the Gulf of Riga, located between the island of Kihnu and the mainland's Tõstamaa peninsula. Together with the neighbouring smaller uninhabited islets Sorgu and Annilaid, Manilaid forms the village of Manija. Administratively the village belongs to Tõstamaa Parish in Pärnu County.

The island was unpoplulated until 1933, when about 80 residents moved to Manilaid from the neighbouring Kihnu. At its peak, there were about 150 residents on the island. During the Soviet era, the population decreased. On January 1, 2011, Manilaid's population was 47.

Manilaid has a ferry connection with the Munalaiu harbour on the mainland. In the winter, when the Gulf of Riga is covered with ice, the island is reachable by ice bridge.

Gallery

See also

List of islands of Estonia

References

Estonian islands in the Baltic